Stefan Branković (c. 1417 – 9 October 1476), also known in historiography as Stefan the Blind (Стефан Слепи), was briefly the despot (ruler) of the Serbian Despotate between 1458 and 1459, member of the Branković dynasty.

Family
Stefan and his relations are named in Dell'Imperadori Constantinopolitani (also known as the "Massarelli manuscript" after the work was found in papers of Angelo Massarelli, the general secretary of the Council of Trent), a manuscript held in the Vatican Library. This manuscript names him a son of Đurađ Branković and Eirene Kantakouzene.  D. M. Nicol (1994) questioned his maternity, suggesting Đurađ had a prior marriage to a daughter of John IV of Trebizond. However his theory presented no sources and failed to take into account that John IV was born between 1395 and 1417. He would be unlikely to be a grandparent by the 1410s.

On 11 September 1429, Đurađ made a donation to Esphigmenou Monastery at Mount Athos. The charter for the document names his wife Irene and five children. The Masarelli manuscript also names the same five children of Đurađ and Eirene. Other genealogies mention a sixth child, Todor Branković. He could be a child who died young and thus not listed with his siblings. The oldest sibling listed in the Massarelli document was Grgur Branković. The 1429 document mentions him with the title of Despot. Grgur was appointed governor of territories of southern Serbia associated to the House of Branković. He was reportedly appointed by Murad II of the Ottoman Empire in 1439. In April 1441, Grgur was accused of plotting against Murad and his governorship terminated. He was imprisoned in Amasya and blinded on 8 May 1441. Grgur and his brothers co-signed a charter by which Đurađ confirmed the privileges to the Republic of Ragusa  Grgur retired to a monastery under the monastic name "German". According to Fine, Grgur resurfaced in 1458, claiming the succession of the vacant throne of Serbia for himself or his son. The Massarelli manuscript mentioned Grgur as unwed. Later genealogies name his wife as "Jelisaveta". Vuk Grgurević, a son of Grgur, was later a titular Serbian despot (1471–1485). He was possibly an illegitimate.

The Massarelli next names an older sister of Stefan, Mara Branković. She was one of the wives of Murad II. Stefan himself is listed third. His younger sister is listed as Cantacuzina, the Latinized version of their mother's last name. Later genealogies give her name as Katarina. She married Ulrich II of Celje. The last and youngest sibling listed was Lazar Branković, successor to their father.

Reign

According to Nicol, Stefan had become a citizen of the Republic of Venice. He was blinded alongside his brother Grgur in 1441. Both blind brothers seem to have been omitted from considerations as possible heirs to their father. They could only claim the throne in 1458, since the death of Lazar left them the only male representatives of the Branković.

According to Fine, Stefan secured the throne by co-operating with his sister-in-law Helena Palaiologina, widow of Lazar. She was a daughter of Thomas Palaiologos, Despot of the Morea, and Catherine Zaccaria of the Principality of Achaea. Helena however arranged the marriage of one of her daughters to Stjepan Tomašević, prince of Bosnia. She thus managed to secure the throne for her new son-in-law. Matthias Corvinus of Hungary and Stjepan Tomaš Kotromanić, King of Bosnia and father of Tomašević, dethroned Stefan on April 8, 1459. They enthroned Stjepan Tomašević as his replacement. At the end of 1459 Stefan decided to travel to Albania, where he had relatives. In mid-1460 he travelled to Albania where he married Angelina Arianit Komneni in November 1460. Angelina was the sister of Donika, who married Skanderbeg. Skanderbeg gave to Stefan Branković an unknown estate as appanage. At the beginning of 1461 Stefan Branković went to Italy with Skanderbeg's written recommendation.

When Serbian Despotate had been lost to Ottomans, Stefan's son Jovan led Serbian refugees to the Kingdom of Hungary. There Jovan was finally recognized as Serbian Despot, with a principality called Raitzen.

Marriage and children

In 1461, Stefan married Angjelina Arianit Komneni, daughter of Albanian voivode of Shkodër and Durrës, Gjergj Arianit Komneni. They had four or five children:

Jovan (d. 10 December 1502). Mentioned first in the Massarelli manuscript. Titular despot of the area of Raitzen, Kingdom of Hungary. Married Jelena Jaksić.  She is mentioned as “Helena, Serbiæ despotissa” in a charted dated to 1502.
Đorđe (d. 18 January 1516). Mentioned second in the Massarelli manuscript. Titular despot of the area of Raitzen, Kingdom of Hungary. Married Isabella del Balzo, daughter of Agilberto, Duke of Nardò. Later retired as a monk under the monastic name "Maxim". Resurfaced as Metropolitan of Ungro-Wallachia from 1508 to 1521. He also held the title of Archbishop of Belgrade.
Irene. Mentioned third in the Massarelli manuscript. Considered to have died young.
Marija (died 27 August 1495). Mentioned fourth and last in the Massarelli manuscript. Married Boniface III, Marquess of Montferrat (1424–1494, reign 1483–1494).
Milica (died 30 January 1554). Not listed in the Massarelli manuscript, only later genealogies. Married Neagoe Basarab, Prince of Wallachia.

Legacy
He is venerated as a Saint Stefan the Blind by the Serbian Orthodox Church.

Ancestry

See also
List of Serbian monarchs

References

Sources

 
 Porčić, Nebojša. "Документи Лазара и Стефана Бранковића о подизању поклада деспота Ђурђа." Иницијал. Часопис за средњовековне студије 2 (2014): 215–239.
 
 

1410s births
1476 deaths
Year of birth uncertain
15th-century Serbian monarchs
Blind royalty and nobility
Stefan
Eastern Orthodox monarchs
Regents of Serbia
Medieval Serbian people of Greek descent
15th-century people from the Ottoman Empire
Serbian saints of the Eastern Orthodox Church
Eastern Orthodox royal saints